Hilary Jean Salvatore (also known as Hilary Salvatore Angelo; born February 14, 1980) is an American film and television actress.

Education
Salvatore comes from an acting family; her brother Jack is also an actor. She graduated with highest honors from Louisville High School in Woodland Hills, California and magna cum laude from California State University, Northridge, where she earned a Bachelor of Arts in Radio, TV and Film with an emphasis in screenwriting.  In college, she was a member of the Kappa Kappa Gamma sorority.

Acting career
Salvatore's first big break came with the role of Kelly Phillips in the Nickelodeon series The Secret World of Alex Mack.  She has guest-starred on many television programs, including The West Wing, Without a Trace, Easy Streets, 18 Wheels of Justice, Promised Land, NCIS, Dharma and Greg and many others.  On the big screen, she has had featured roles in films such as American Pie, Bring It On and Charlie Wilson's War.

Personal life
On October 22, 2005, Salvatore married Jack Angelo, a Los Angeles-based screenwriter and director.

Filmography

Film

Television

References

External links

1980 births
20th-century American actresses
21st-century American actresses
Actresses from New York City
American child actresses
American film actresses
American television actresses
California State University, Northridge alumni
Living people